The 400 metres at the World Championships in Athletics has been contested by both men and women since the inaugural edition in 1983. It is the second most prestigious title in the discipline after the 400 metres at the Olympics. The competition format typically has two or three qualifying rounds leading to a final between eight athletes.

The championship records for the event are 43.18 seconds for men, set by Michael Johnson in 1999, and 47.99 seconds for women, set by Jarmila Kratochvílová in 1983. The men's world record has been broken at the competition on one occasion and Johnson's championship record remains the world record as of 2015. The current women's championship record stood as the women's world record for two years and remains the only time that feat has been accomplished at the championships.

Michael Johnson is the most successful athlete of the World Championships 400 m, having won four straight titles from 1993 to 1999. He is the only sprint athlete to have won that many individual titles in an event. The second most successful is LaShawn Merritt – a two-time champion and the only other athlete to have won four medals. The most successful women are Marie-José Pérec, Cathy Freeman and Christine Ohuruogu, all of whom have won two world titles. Jeremy Wariner is the only other person to have won two titles, and also has three medals to his name.

The United States is comfortably the most successful nation in the discipline – American men have topped the podium ten times and taken 23 medals in total. American women also top the table with two golds among seven medals. Jamaica is the only other nation to have won more than one medal in the men's race, and has won eleven medals in total across the sexes. Great Britain has had two winners and two runners-up. Australia, France and Bahamas are the only other nations to have won multiple gold
medals.

Jerome Young is the only athlete to be stripped of a medal in the event, as he lost his 2003 gold medal due to a doping ban.

Age
All information from World Athletics

Doping
Antonio Pettigrew, the 1991 champion, was the first have his results annulled due to doping, although this ban affected his finalist placings from 1997 to 2001 only. His fellow American Jerome Young became the first and thus far only 400 m athlete to be stripped of their world title. His ban covered his 2003 win, a 2001 semi-finalist placing, and a fourth-place finish in 1999.

Natalya Sologub of Belarus became the first female 400 m runner to be disqualified from the championships, having originally been a 2001 semi-finalist. The 2003 sixth-place finish of Calvin Harrison was annulled for doping, as weer the semi-finalist runs of Amaka Ogoegbunam in 2009 and Antonina Yefremova in 2011.

Medalists

Men

Multiple medalists

Medalists by country

Women

Multiple medalists

Medalists by country

Championship record progression

Men

Women

Finishing times

Top ten fastest World Championship times

References

Bibliography

External links
Official IAAF website

 
World Championships in Athletics
Events at the World Athletics Championships